Francis Alvin Pearman, II (born August 10, 1982) is an American professor and former American football running back. He was drafted by the Jacksonville Jaguars in the fourth round of the 2005 NFL Draft. During his career he played for the Jacksonville Jaguars, Seattle Seahawks, and Tennessee Titans. He played football for the Virginia Cavaliers. He received his B.S. from the University of Virginia in 2005.

At the conclusion of his NFL career, Pearman earned a M.Ed. and Ph.D. from Vanderbilt University. He is currently an assistant professor of education in the Graduate School of Education at Stanford University. He was previously a professor of Urban Education at the University of Pittsburgh.

Professional career

Jacksonville Jaguars
Pearman was drafted by the Jacksonville Jaguars in the fourth round (127th overall) of the 2005 NFL Draft. He wore number 34 while with the team.

As a rookie, Pearman carried the ball 39 times for 149 yards and a touchdown. He also caught 32 passes for 240 yards.  Pearman handled the bulk of the team's punt returns during the season, averaging 8.4 yards on 49 attempts. He finished the 2005 regular season with 986 all-purpose yards. In his first NFL game, he forced a fumble on the opening kickoff which ultimately led to a field goal.

Seattle Seahawks
On September 1, 2007, Pearman was traded to the Seattle Seahawks for a sixth-round draft choice. After suffering a knee injury, the team placed him on injured reserve on October 2, 2007.

Jacksonville Jaguars (second stint)
Pearman was re-signed by the Jacksonville Jaguars on December 11, 2008, after running back Fred Taylor was placed on injured reserve. Pearman scored a 23-yard receiving touchdown, his only reception of the season, in the season finale against the Baltimore Ravens. The team waived Pearman on September 5, 2009.

Tennessee Titans
Pearman signed with the Tennessee Titans on October 30, 2009, and was assigned jersey number 35. During the 2009 season, Pearman played in 5 games, returned 11 punts for 112 yards (10.2 average) and 8 kickoffs for 174 yards (21.8 average). He also registered 4 tackles.  At the start of the 2010–2011 season, Pearman was listed as third on the team's running back depth chart behind Chris Johnson and Javon Ringer.

External links
Jacksonville Jaguars bio

1982 births
Living people
People from Princeton, New Jersey
Players of American football from New Jersey
American football return specialists
American football running backs
Virginia Cavaliers football players
Jacksonville Jaguars players
Seattle Seahawks players
Tennessee Titans players